Stonedhenge is the second studio album released by the English blues rock band Ten Years After, released in 1969.

Track listing
Side one
"Going to Try" (Alvin Lee) – 4:52
"I Can't Live Without Lydia" (Chick Churchill) – 1:23
"Woman Trouble" (Alvin Lee) – 4:37
"Skoobly-Oobly-Doobob" (Alvin Lee) – 1:44
"Hear Me Calling" (Alvin Lee) – 5:41

Side two
"A Sad Song" (Alvin Lee) – 3:24
"Three Blind Mice" (traditional, arranged by Ric Lee) – 0:57
"No Title" (Alvin Lee) – 8:15
"Faro" (Leo Lyons) – 1:13
"Speed Kills" (Alvin Lee, Mike Vernon) – 3:42

Remastered CD bonus tracks
Stonedhenge was remastered and reissued in 2002 with several bonus tracks:
"Hear Me Calling" (Single version) (Alvin Lee) – 3:44
"Woman Trouble" (US version) (Alvin Lee) – 4:48
"I'm Going Home" (Single version) (Alvin Lee) – 3:34
"Boogie On" (Alvin Lee) – 14:44

Personnel
Ten Years After
Alvin Lee – vocals, guitar, piano, Chinese fans
Chick Churchill – organ, piano
Ric Lee – drums, tympani
Leo Lyons – bass, bow-bass, string bass, percussion
Additional personnel
 Roy Baker – sound effects on "No Title"
 Martin Smith – train sound effects on "Speed Kills"
 Simon Stable (credited as "Count Simon (Stable) de la Bedoyere") – bongos on "Going to Try"
 Mike Vernon – backing vocals on "Hear Me Calling"

Charts

Album
Album – Billboard (United States)

Release history

References

External links

1969 albums
Ten Years After albums
Deram Records albums
Albums produced by Mike Vernon (record producer)